Sabbatical is a 2007 Canadian television film that was filmed in August 2007 as a pilot, and aired on CTV on 23 November 2007.

Plot 
The film follows Patrick Marlowe (who is on sabbatical), his paleontologist wife Dr. Julie Marlowe, and their children, as they leave the big city for Julie's dinosaur dig in Saskatchewan's Avonlea Badlands (located south of Regina).

To be close to the dig the family moves to the fictional small town of Beacon Vista.  On their way to Beacon Vista, their mildly autistic son Danny is almost kidnapped by a trucker, who had previously helped them change a tire while flirting with the daughter Gwyneth.

The family quickly finds some oddities about their new home.  Cell phones don't work, and the local minister preaches the end is near.

The family wakes up after their first night in the new home to discover that a triple murder, a mother and two children whose husband/father is working on an oil rig, occurred next door while they slept.

Later, while both playing a video game and sleeping, Danny has some sort of psychic vision related to the murders.

Patrick also has a back-story involving a scam he pulled with Jack Driscoll (a now dead former coworker) and some related missing money.

The last revelations of the film are that the murders, and possibly some local teens, are connected to devil worship.  While Sabbatical and Sabbath are related in their connection to time off and generally have positive connotations, the root sabbat is also used for Wiccan holidays, and has a history of negative connotations in fictional works (music, and games).

Cast
 Matthew Bennett as Patrick Marlowe
 Anne Marie DeLuise (née Anne Marie Loder) as Julie Marlowe
 Tatiana Maslany as Gwyneth Marlowe
 Quinn Lord as Danny Marlowe
 Greyston Holt as Jordan (the local teen leader)
 Antonio Cupo as Paolo (Julie's associate at the dig)
 Crystal Allen as Wendy (the bartender)
 Tygh Runyan as Caleb Brown (the trucker)
 Stephen McHattie as Police Chief Gil Brewer
 Patrick McKenna as Reverend Brown
 Daniella Beltrami as Betty (next door neighbour, and ghost)

Crew
 casting – Corinne Clark & Jennifer Page
 costume designer – Jill Aslin
 production designer – Sara McCudden
 editor – Teresa Hannigan
 composer – James Jandrisch
 director of photography – Michael Storey, CSC
 line producer – Rhonda Baker
 co-producer – Stephen Onda
 supervising producer – Shannon Farr
 executive producer – Barbara Bowlby
 executive producer – John Brunton
 creator & writer – Peter Mitchell
 director – Ken Girotti

Production
 Insight Production Company Ltd. (Insight Production Company)
 Saskatchewan Film and Video Development Corporation (SaskFilm)
 CTV Television Network (CTV)

References

External links
 

Canadian television films
CTV Television Network original programming
English-language Canadian films